Flavobacterium chungbukense is a Gram-negative, strictly aerobic, rod-shaped and non-motile bacterium from the genus of Flavobacterium which has been isolated from soil from Chungbuk in Korea.

References

chungbukense
Bacteria described in 2011